The Berkeley Apartments is a historic three-story apartment building in Omaha, Nebraska. It was built by O.F. Nelson in 1915, and designed in an eclectic style with Prairie School features by H. D. Frankfurt. By the 1990s, it was "one of the finest surviving examples" of buildings designed by Frankfurt. It has been listed on the National Register of Historic Places since July 19, 1996.

References

National Register of Historic Places in Omaha, Nebraska
Residential buildings completed in 1915
1915 establishments in Nebraska